William Stephen Bell (December 9, 1947 – June 25, 2022) was an American football placekicker who played two seasons in the National Football League (NFL) with the Atlanta Falcons and three games with the New England Patriots. He was drafted by the Atlanta Falcons in the 17th round of the 1970 NFL Draft. He played college football at the University of Kansas and attended Falls Church High School in West Falls Church, Virginia.

Bell wore jersey number 100 in 1969 while playing for the Kansas Jayhawks as part of the celebration of the 100th anniversary of college football; he is one of only two players to wear a number higher than 99 in an officially sanctioned football game (Chuck Kinder, who wore the number 100 in 1963, is the other).

As of 2004, Bell was serving as a maintenance worker in Douglas County, Kansas, a position he had held since 1988. Bell died on June 25, 2022.

References

External links
Just Sports Stats
College stats

1947 births
2022 deaths
Players of American football from Kentucky
American football placekickers
Kansas Jayhawks football players
Atlanta Falcons players
New England Patriots players